Robert Mandan (February 2, 1932 – April 29, 2018) was an American actor, best known for his roles as Sam Reynolds on Search for Tomorrow (1965–1970), Chester Tate, the womanizing businessman husband of Jessica Tate (Katherine Helmond) on the satirical sitcom Soap (1977–1981) and James Bradford on the short lived Three's Company spin off Three's A Crowd (1984–1985) that lasted for one season.

Career
Mandan first acted in such television serials as NBC's From These Roots (1958–1961) and businessman Sam Reynolds on Search for Tomorrow (1965–1970). He also appeared on Broadway in the 1970 musical Applause.

His sitcom appearances prior to Soap include an auctioneer in the 1972 premiere episode of Sanford and Son, attorney Mr. Morrison in a 1973 episode of All in the Family, and Maude's gay friend Barry on a 1974 episode of Maude.  In 1972, Mandan appeared in the first episode of the last season of 'Mission Impossible as Tim Sharkey. He also appeared in the Barnaby Jones episodes titled "Counterfall" and "Killer on Campus", and guest-starred in an episode of the western series Sara in 1976. He played Mr. Kirby in the 1979 NBC television adaptation of You Can't Take it With You and the ineffective but well-meaning Colonel Fielding on the 1981 TV adaptation of Private Benjamin. He also had roles in two movies in 1982, as school principal Walter J. Coolidge in Zapped! and Senator Charles Wingwood in The Best Little Whorehouse in Texas.  In 1982 he also played Henry's older brother Bill Rush in Too Close for Comfort.In 1984–85, he played James Bradford on ABC's Three's a Crowd opposite John Ritter, and in 1986 he was Peace Corps member Dr. Bruce Gaines, who married Mrs. Garrett (played by Charlotte Rae) in her final episodes on The Facts of Life. He appeared as Steven in the 1990 episode of The Golden Girls entitled "Great Expectations". In 1991, he reunited with Katherine Helmond for two episodes of her next series, Who's the Boss?.

In 1993, he played the Cardassian character Kotan Pa'Dar in the Star Trek: Deep Space Nine episode "Cardassians", and had a role on Married... with Children in the episode "The D'Arcy Files" (1994). His return to serials included the roles of Maxwell Hammer, a friend of Minx, on Santa Barbara (1990), Mr. Jonesy (alongside Louise Sorel) on Days of Our Lives from 1997 to 1998, and guest-starring as a judge on General Hospital in early 2006.

He appeared onstage throughout his career. Aside from Applause, he starred in the pre-Broadway version of the 1990s revival of How to Succeed in Business Without Really Trying as J.B. Biggley, he played Andrew Wyke in several touring company productions of the Anthony Shaffer mystery, Sleuth, and he was in the 2002 production of A Twilight Romance at the Falcon Theatre in Burbank, California.

Mandan was a frequent special guest on The $25,000 Pyramid during the 1980s. He also appeared on many other game shows, including Match Game, Family Feud, Super Password, Chain Reaction, and Hollywood Squares''.

Death
Mandan died in Los Angeles on April 29, 2018, following a long battle with cancer. He was survived by his wife, Sherry Dixon, a licensed primal psychotherapist; the couple wed in 1963. Upon his death, he was cremated.

Filmography

References

External links

 

1932 births
2018 deaths
20th-century American male actors
21st-century American male actors
American male musical theatre actors
American male soap opera actors
American male television actors
Male actors from Missouri
People from Christian County, Missouri